Dave Hall ( Dave "Jam" Hall) is an American record producer. He is best known for working on Mary J. Blige's debut album What's the 411? (including the No. 1 R&B hit single "You Remind Me"); co-writing and co-producing with Madonna several tracks from her 1994 album Bedtime Stories, including the single "Human Nature"; for working with R&B harmony group Brownstone; and for co-producing two of Mariah Carey's No. 1 hits, "Dreamlover" and "Fantasy". He also produced for Usher, Donell Jones, CeCe Peniston, and Joe early in their music careers.

He is also a remixer responsible for remixes of "Scream" (1995) by Michael and Janet Jackson and "Goldeneye" (1995) for Tina Turner.

He was married to comedian Wanda Sykes from 1991 to 1998.

Production discography 

Brand Nubian – One For All (1990)
  Try To Do Me

Heavy D. & the Boyz – Peaceful Journey (1991)
 Body and Mind (produced with Nevelle Hodge)

Strictly Business- Original Motion Picture Soundtrack (1991)
 Stephanie Mills – I Just Want Love
 Jeff Redd – You Called and Told Me
 Mary J. Blige – You Remind Me

Stephanie Mills – Something Real (1992)
 I Just Want Love

Shinehead – Sidewalk University (1992)
 Try My Love

Father MC – Close to You (1992)
 All I Want

Mary J. Blige – What's the 411? (1992)
 Reminisce
 You Remind Me
 Love No Limit
 My Love

Intro – Intro (1993)
 Let Me Be the One
 It's All About You
 So Many Reasons

Joe – Everything (1993)
 Baby Don't Stop

Mariah Carey – Music Box (1993)
 Dreamlover

Jomanda – Nubia Soul (1993)
 Back to You
 Tonight's the Night

Eddie F. and the Untouchables – Let's Get It On (1994)
 Intro- Never Again
 Porche (band) – Make You Feel Real Good

Changing Faces – Changing Faces (1994)
 Am I Wasting My Time

Jade – Mind, Body & Song (1994) 
 If the Mood Is Right
 If the Lovin' Ain't Good

Usher – Usher (1994)
 The Many Ways
 Final Goodbye

Brownstone – From the Bottom Up (1994)
 Grapevyne
 If You Love Me

Madonna – Bedtime Stories (1994)
 I'd Rather Be Your Lover
 Human Nature
 Love Tried to Welcome Me

Intro – New Life (1995)
 Funny How Time Flies
 My Love's on the Way

Silk – Silk (1995)
 Now That I've Lost You

Phyllis Hyman – I Refuse to Be Lonely (1995)
 It's Not About You (It's About Me)

Mariah Carey – Daydream (1995)
 Fantasy
 Slipping Away (B-side to the single "Always Be My Baby")

Horace Brown – Horace Brown (1996)
 Taste Your Love
 I Like
 Gotta Find a Way

Kenny Lattimore – Kenny Lattimore (1996)
 Never Too Busy
 I Won't Let You Down

Assorted Phlavors – Assorted Phlavors (1996) 
 Tell Me
 Hiding Place
 Trust
 What Ya Gonna Do (Interlude)
 Patience
 Don't Let Go
 Tonight (Interlude)
 Can't Get You Off My Mind
 Love So Real (Interlude)
 Don't Stop (Interlude)
 Patience (Remix)

CeCe Peniston – I'm Movin' On (1996)
 Movin' On

Brownstone – Still Climbing (1997)
 In the Game of Love

Kurupt – Kuruption! (Disc Two) (1998)
 Who Do U Be (Produced by RJ Rice, additional production and remix by Dave "Jam" Hall)

References 

Living people
Place of birth missing (living people)
Year of birth missing (living people)
American record producers